Scotta is a surname.  It may refer to:
 Enrico Scotta (born 1949), Italian painter and sculptor
 Frida Scotta (1871–1948), the stage name of Danish violinist Frida von Kaulbach (1871–1948)
 Giancarlo Scottà (b. 1953), Italian politician
 Héctor Scotta (b. 1950), Argentine footballer
 Néstor Scotta (1948–2001), Argentine footballer (Héctor's brother)

See also
Scota
Scotia (disambiguation)
Scottia (disambiguation)